Carree is a surname. Notable people with this name include the following:

Franciscus Carree (ca. 1630 - 1669), Dutch painter
Isaac Carree (born 1973), American musician
Michiel Carree (1657 – 1727), Dutch painter

See also

Carré (surname)
Carré Otis
Carrie (name)
Carrer (disambiguation)